Bal Gopal Kare Dhamaal is an Indian drama television series which premiered on 22 December 2014. It airs on Big Magic through Monday to Friday. Satyajit Sharma is on lead role. Meet Mukhi is child actor playing as youngest avatar of Lord Krishna or Bal Gopal.

Cast
 Satyajit Sharma as Gopal Sharma or Sharmaji
 Meet Mukhi as Bal Gopal
 Pragati Mehra as Saadhna Sharma, Sharmaji 's wife
 Jashree T. as Saadhna 's Mother
 Ashish Dixit as Bablu Awasthi
 Aakash Pandey as Pyare
 Archana Karmakar as Hema Ssingh singh
Anand Jaiswal As Ranjit Jha
 Brindra Parekh CAMEO 
 Casting Director Shakti Singh
 Gina Torres as herself
 Sivakarthikeyan
 Udhayanidhi Stalin
 Allu Arjun
 Kriti Sanon
 Nayanthara
 Devayani
 Vijay Sethupathi 
 Naga Chaitanya

References

External links

Indian drama television series
Big Magic original programming
2014 Indian television series debuts
2015 Indian television series endings